John Broadhurst Boothman (16 July 1906 – 14 July 1989) was an Australian rules footballer who played for Hawthorn in the Victorian Football League (VFL).

Boothman received many offers from other clubs but played for the Hawthorn Football Club in 1927, two years after they entered the VFL competition. He was the 62nd player to represent the club and wore the #6 guernsey.  He was absent from the 1927 team photo due to a knee injury he sustained during that season. Boothman's photo was requested by Hawthorn in 2009 and was displayed in a gallery of the club's past players at their Museum at Waverley Park.

Boothman left Hawthorn half way through the 1927 season and played out his career as a wing for Camberwell Football Club.  His playing career with Camberwell lasted 8 years and resulted in best and fairest awards.

References

Australian rules footballers from Victoria (Australia)
Hawthorn Football Club players
Camberwell Football Club players
1906 births
1989 deaths